The McDonnell CF-101 Voodoo was an all-weather interceptor aircraft operated by the Royal Canadian Air Force and the Canadian Forces between 1961 and 1984. They were manufactured by the McDonnell Aircraft Corporation of St. Louis, Missouri for the United States Air Force (as F-101s), and later sold to Canada. CF-101s replaced the obsolete Avro CF-100 Canuck in the RCAF's all-weather fighter squadrons. The Voodoo's primary armament was nuclear AIR-2A Genie unguided air-to-air rockets, and there was significant political controversy in Canada about their adoption. Although they never fired a weapon in wartime, the CF-101 served as Canada's primary means of air defence from Quick Reaction Alert facilities at Canadian airbases. The CF-101s were retired in the 1980s and replaced with McDonnell Douglas CF-18 Hornet fighters. Many examples are preserved in museums and parks in Canada and the United States.

Acquisition

Origins
After the cancellation of the CF-105 Arrow program in February 1959, George Pearkes, the Canadian Minister of National Defence officially maintained that the existing Avro CF-100 interceptors and the Bomarc missiles that had been ordered in September 1958 would be adequate for Canada's air defense needs. Unofficially, it was recognized that there was still a bomber threat, and discussions had been underway since before the formal conclusion of the Avro Arrow program concerning the RCAF acquiring an "off-the-shelf" interceptor from the United States.

The USAF indicated that it was prepared to make 56 F-101B interceptors and 10 F-101F trainers available (by employing Convair F-102 Delta Daggers in less demanding NORAD sectors) for Canadian purchase. The deal was delayed for over a year by negotiations over acquisition costs and offsets, as well as debate within the Diefenbaker government about Canada adopting nuclear weapons systems, which had been agreed to, in principle, in 1958. The financial arrangements were sorted out by Canada taking over the staffing and funding of 11 Pinetree Line radar stations within Canada that had formerly been operated and funded by the USAF. A detailed agreement signed in June 1961 covered the transfer of the aircraft, meant to equip five front-line squadrons (replacing nine CF-100 squadrons) and an Operational Training Unit (OTU).

Nuclear weapons controversy

The issue of nuclear weapons in Canada had not been resolved in June 1961, thus the CF-101s were armed only with their secondary AIM-4D Falcon missiles. In April 1963, the issue led to the collapse of the Diefenbaker government. The succeeding Pearson government signed an agreement with the United States concerning nuclear arms for Canada on 16 August 1963. The agreement did not actually state that Canada was acquiring nuclear weapons; the Canadian government usually refused to confirm or deny that there were any nuclear arms in Canada. The agreement specifically stated that the AIR-2A Genie rockets were the property of the United States and would only be released to Canada for actual use with the joint agreement of Canada and the United States through NORAD. The stringent training requirements meant that it took until June 1965 for the Genies to become operational in Canada. The Genies were kept in the custody of the USAF, with detachments of the 425th Munitions Support Squadron located at each of the Canadian bases.

Operational history

On 24 July 1961, the first two aircraft were transferred to Canada in a ceremony at RCAF Uplands in Ottawa, marking the beginning of Operation Queen's Row. 425 Squadron officially began Voodoo operations at RCAF Namao, Alberta, on 15 October 1961, initially acting as the conversion training squadron for 410, 416, 409, and 414 Squadrons. No. 425 Squadron then became an operational unit itself, turning the conversion role over to No. 3 All Weather OTU at RCAF Bagotville, Quebec. By the end of 1962, the squadrons were operating out of RCAF Comox, British Columbia, (409 Squadron), RCAF North Bay, Ontario, (414 Squadron), RCAF Uplands, Ottawa, Ontario, (410 Squadron), RCAF Bagotville, Quebec, (425 Squadron), and RCAF Chatham, New Brunswick, (416 Squadron). Defence cuts in 1964 eliminated Nos. 410 and 414 Squadrons (although a reformed 414 Squadron would operate the Voodoo years later).

Each Voodoo base was laid out to allow aircraft to be kept at immediate readiness at all times. A Quick Reaction Alert (QRA) facility was positioned at the end of the main runway to allow alert aircraft to launch as quickly as possible. Two aircraft and their crews were always on "five minute" alert — the aircraft were to be in the air, en route to intercept unknown aircraft, within five minutes of receiving the order. In one instance, 416 Squadron was able to get two alert aircraft in the air only 57 seconds after receiving the alert. Voodoos were dispatched with some regularity to intercept unidentified NORAD radar contacts, usually airliners flying off course, although 416 and 425 occasionally intercepted Soviet Tu-95 Bear bombers flying along the Atlantic coast to Cuba. Fortunately, no situation ever arose in which a CF-101 pilot fired his weapons in anger.

Between 1970 and 1972, Canada traded the 56 survivors of the original CF-101 fleet back to the USAF for 66 replacements under Operation Peace Wings. The "new" replacement aircraft were actually manufactured earlier than the original fleet, but the "new" airframes had a lower number of hours, plus the "new" Voodoos received updates which the original Canadian Voodoos had not received (including the addition of an IR tracking system). Bristol Aerospace of Winnipeg, Manitoba, performed modifications on the incoming fleet, which involved transferring some specifically Canadian items of equipment, including engines, from the "old" aircraft to the "new." Many of the "old" Canadian Voodoos were scrapped when they returned to the U.S., but 22 were converted to RF-101B photo-reconnaissance versions and flew with the Nevada Air National Guard until 1975.

During its service, the CF-101 was a popular performer at airshows and other events in Canada and the United States; displays ranged from a single aircraft's appearance to an entire squadron. In 1967, a CF-101 flew (in company with a CF-104 and The Red Knight T-33) in the Golden Centennaires display team to mark the nation's Centennial. In 1984, each squadron painted a special "show" aircraft to commemorate the type's impending retirement. 409 Squadron produced "Hawk One Canada," 416 Squadron produced "Lynx One Canada," and 425 Squadron produced "Lark One Canada/Alouette Un Canada."

Obsolescence and retirement
Through the 1970s, the increasing obsolescence of the CF-101 and the CF-104 led to the New Fighter Aircraft program. Launched in 1977, the program sought a replacement for the CF-5, CF-104 Starfighter, and CF-101 Voodoo. The Grumman F-14 Tomcat, F-15 Eagle, F-16 Falcon, McDonnell Douglas F/A-18 Hornet, Panavia Tornado, Dassault Mirage F1, and the Mirage 2000 were evaluated as potential replacements. Cost considerations reduced the choice to the F-16 and F-18; the F-18 was ultimately selected in April 1980. The Voodoo OTU converted to CF-18 Hornets in June 1982; 409 and 425 Squadrons also stood down in June 1984. In 1985 416 Squadron moved from CFB Chatham, New Brunswick to CFB Cold Lake, Alberta and converted from the CF-101 Voodoo to the CF-18 Hornet tactical fighter. With the stand down, the last nuclear weapons in Canada were returned to the United States.

Two Voodoos remained in service after the stand-down: the unique EF-101B electronic jamming aircraft (also known as the "Electric Voodoo") and a single CF-101F trainer, in service with 414 Squadron at North Bay, Ontario. The EF-101B was a conversion of a regular F-101B, incorporating the electronic jamming suite from an EB-57E Canberra. Only one aircraft was converted before the program was cancelled and this sole example was leased to Canada. The last two Voodoos continued to fly until April 1987, when they were finally retired. The EF-101B was returned to the United States on 7 April 1987, while CF-101F 101006 made the world's last Voodoo flight on 9 April 1987, as it made a delivery flight from CFB North Bay to CFB Greenwood via CFB Bagotville and CFB Chatham for eventual display at CFB Cornwallis, Nova Scotia, where it decorated the parade square at the Recruit School. After CFB Cornwallis closed in 1995, 006 was moved to beside the Cornwallis Military Museum, located in the old St Georges Chapel on base. In October 2013, because of corrosion and security concerns,  the museum donated 006 to the Jet Aircraft Museum in London, Ontario, where it is presently undergoing refurbishment.

Variants

 CF-101B : Two-seat all-weather interceptor fighter aircraft.
 CF-101F : Two-seat, dual control training aircraft.
 EF-101B : Electronic jamming aircraft.

Operators
 / 
Royal Canadian Air Force/Canadian Forces<ref>Baugher, Joe. "Voodoos for Canada." "USAF fighters, 7 January 2003. Retrieved: 6 October 2011.</ref>
No. 409 Squadron RCAF – CFB Comox
No. 410 Squadron RCAF – CFB Uplands
No. 414 Squadron RCAF – CFB North Bay
No. 416 Squadron RCAF – CFB Chatham
No. 425 Squadron RCAF – CFB Bagotville

Aircraft on display

Over 30 Canadian and ex-Canadian CF-101s are preserved in museums and as memorials in Canada and the United States.

Specifications (F-101B)

See also

References
Notes

Bibliography

 Clearwater, John M. Canadian Nuclear Weapons: The Untold Story of Canada's Cold War Arsenal. Toronto: Dundurn Press, 1998. .
 Dempsey, Dan.  A Tradition of Excellence: Canada's Airshow Team Heritage. Victoria, BC: High Flight Enterprises, 2002. .
 Dorr, Robert F. McDonnell F-101 Voodoo. London: Osprey Publications, 1987. .
 Dorr, Robert F.  "McDonnell F-88/F-101 Voodoo Variant Briefing." Wings of Fame, Vol 1. London: Aerospace Publishing Ltd., 1995. .
 Francillon, René J. "It's Witchcraft: McDonnell's F-101 Voodoo." Airpower: Vol. 10, no. 3. May 1980.
 Green, William and Gordon Swanborough. The Great Book of Fighters. St. Paul, Minnesota: MBI Publishing, 2001. .
 Keenan, Martin.  "Voodoo Magic."  Air Force, Vol. 27, #1 (Spring 2003). Ottawa: Canadian Air Force Association, 2003.
 Knaack, Marcelle Size. Encyclopedia of US Air Force Aircraft and Missile Systems: Volume 1 Post-World War II Fighters 1945–1973. Washington, DC: Office of Air Force History, 1978. .
 McIntyre, Robert.  CF-101 Voodoo: Canadian Profile. Ottawa: SMS Publishing, 1984. .
 Milberry, Larry. Canada's Air Force at War and Peace, Volume 3. Toronto: CANAV Books, 2000. .
 Rankin-Lowe, Jeff and Andrew Cline. The Aircraft of the Canadian Armed Forces''. Toronto: Sirius Publications (independently published), 1996. No ISBN.

External links

 A list of preserved Canadian Voodoos

1960s Canadian fighter aircraft
CF-101
Twinjets
Mid-wing aircraft
Canada–United States military relations